Edward Dun (died 11 September 1663), also referred to as Squire Dun, was an English executioner who served as London's 'common hangman' from 1649 to 1663. He assumed the post shortly following the death in June 1649 of Richard Brandon, the headsman believed to have executed Charles I.

It is possible that he performed the posthumous executions of Oliver Cromwell, Henry Ireton and John Bradshaw in 1661, his role in which is described in The last farewel of three bould traytors by Abraham Miles. He died on 11 September 1663. He was succeeded as 'common hangman' by the better-known Jack Ketch, who had been his apprentice.

References

External links 
Groanes from Newgate; OR, AN ELEGY UPON Edvvard Dun Esq: The Cities Common Hangman, who Dyed Naturally in his bed, the 11th. of September, 1663 by 'a Person of quality', 1663.
The last farewel of three bould traytors by Abraham Miles,  1661.

English executioners
1663 deaths
17th-century English people
Year of birth unknown